Coixtlahuaca may refer to:
Coixtlahuaca, a pre-Columbian polity
San Juan Bautista Coixtlahuaca, a municipality in Oaxaca, Mexico
Coixtlahuaca Valley